RaiSat was a subsidiary of RAI created in 1997 to produce thematic TV channels for satellite television that are now available in IPTV and digital terrestrial television with various providers.

History 
Rai Sat was created as external company in 1997 to create the first satellite channels of public service.

In July 1999, with the transfer from Rai's staff that was employed towards thematic channels, the company began to produce the first pay satellite platform networks for Tele+, then reorganized under Sky.

In 2009, following the non-renewal of the contract with Sky (Platform for which RaiSat produced exclusively its channels) it was announced that the parent company was preparing to fold RaiSat.

Until 18 March 2010, the shareholders of RaiSat were Rai (with 95% shares) and RCS MediaGroup (with 5% shares), On that date, the proportion of shares owned by RCS (equivalent to three million €) was liquidated.

On 18 May 2010, RaiSat was folded into Rai.

Television channels

The first free channels
Activities started under Rai's ownership with 4 channels in September–October 1997, followed by a fifth in 1999:
 Rai Sat 1 - Cultura e spettacolo
 Rai Sat 2 - Ragazzi
 Rai Sat 3 - Enciclopedia
 Rai Sat Nettuno (now Uninettuno Università TV)
 Rai Sport Satellite (1 February 1999)

On 29 July 1998, the channels were outsourced to RaiSat S.p.A.

Transformation into pay-TV
In 1999, Rai's satellite channels were encrypted and RaiSat 3 was changed to RaiSat Educational.

The other 2 channels became 7 and were available on D+ (later TELE+ DIGITALE):
 RaiSat Ragazzi dedicated to children and teens
 RaiSat Gambero Rosso dedicated to cooking
 RaiSat Cinema dedicated to cinema
 RaiSat Album dedicated to history and the memory of the past
 RaiSat Show dedicated to the shows
 RaiSat Art dedicated to artistic and cultural heritage
 RaiSat Fiction dedicated to TV series

Sky era
In 2003, when Sky launched, Rai Sat reorganized its channels. Raisat Art, Raisat Fiction, Raisat Album and Raisat Show were sacrificed.

5 channels were included in the Mondo Sky package:
 Raisat Ragazzi
 Raisat Gambero Rosso
 Raisat Cinema World (former Raisat Cinema)
 Raisat Prem1um (merger of Raisat Album and Raisat Fiction)
 Raisat Extra (former Raisat Show)

On 1 November 2006, RaiSat Cinema World reverted to the old name RaiSat Cinema, and RaiSat Ragazzi and was divided into:
 RaiSat YOYO
 RaiSat Smash

On 1 January 2009, RaiSat Smash rebranded to RaiSat Smash Girls.

Return to free to air
On 31 July 2009, at the end of lengthy negotiations, Rai wasn't able to renew the contract with Sky for the transmission of RaiSat channels. The bouquet was thus forced to abandon the satellite platform for a fee and was brought resized on DTT and on the nascent Tivùsat satellite platform.

As a result, RaiSat Gambero Rosso was sold, while RaiSat Smash Girls was closed down.

The available channels spared down to 4 and they were no longer visible in the Sky bouquet, but on terrestrial television and the Tivùsat satellite platform as well as streaming on Rai.tv:

 RaiSat Extra
 RaiSat Prem1um
 RaiSat Cinema
 RaiSat YOYO

On 18 May 2010, Rai absorbed the company, and reorganized all channels by changing their name (with the removal of the word Sat) and directly overseeing the program schedules, as a result:
 RaiSat Extra was changed to Rai Extra.
 RaiSat Prem1um was changed to Rai Premium.
 RaiSat Cinema was changed to Rai Movie.
 RaiSat YOYO was changed to Rai Yoyo.

On 26 November 2010, Rai Extra was closed and replaced by Rai 5.

References

External links

1997 establishments in Italy
2010 disestablishments in Italy
Television channels and stations established in 1997
Italian brands
Italian-language television networks
Multilingual broadcasters
Sat
RCS MediaGroup
Satellite television